TownLink is a circular bus route that operates in St Helier on Jersey. It is operated by LibertyBus.

History 
In the late 1990s, a circular route branded "Hoppa" operated within St Helier, but it was short lived. The introduction of a bus service was approved in 2011, but did not launch in 2013 as intended.

In January 2021, it was announced that a new route would be trialed in the summer. In August 2021, a £365,000 contract was agreed with LibertyBus and it was stated that the route would start by the end of 2021. The route started on 30 May 2022.

Service 
The bus service operates from Monday to Saturday between 9am and 6pm. The entire loop takes around 30 minutes.

References 

Bus routes in Jersey
Circular bus routes
Saint Helier